Carla Boni (17 July 1925 in Ferrara, Italy – 17 October 2009 in Rome, Italy), was an Italian singer.

Life and career
Born as Carla Gaiano in Ferrara, Boni had worked on RAI, the Italian State Radio and television network, as a singer since 1951. She sang the Italian version of song Johnny Guitar. In 1953 she won the Festival della canzone italiana with Flo Sandon, singing "Viale d'Autunno". In 1955 Boni won the "Festival di Napoli" with the song "'E stelle 'e Napule", which she sang with her husband, Gino Latilla. In 1956 she released a new version of the standard Mambo Italiano, which went on to become her greatest hit. In 1957 she released the song "La Casetta in Canada". During her career she formed a band with her husband, Nilla Pizzi and Giorgio Consolini. During the 1990s she introduced a new version of "Mambo Italiano".

Last years

In 2007 she pulled out of the making of an album  which was to be titled "Aeroplani e Angeli" with songs written by Alessandro Orlando Graziani. Although seriously ill in 2009 she shot a music video for the song "Portami in India". On 5 October 2008 Carla Boni participated in the event Omaggio a Pino Rucher, una vita per la chitarra / Homage to Pino Rucher, a life for the guitar. The event in honor of Pino Rucher (RAI guitarist), twelve years after his death, was sponsored by the Municipal Authorities of Manfredonia and by the Authorities of the Province of Foggia.

Death
She died in Rome at age of 84 after a long illness. Her funeral was held at the Santa Maria in Montesanto church, known as the "Church of artists".

References

External links

1925 births
2009 deaths
Sanremo Music Festival winners
Musicians from Ferrara
Singers from Rome
20th-century Italian women singers
Burials at the Cimitero Flaminio